The 2014–15 Maine Black Bears men's ice hockey team represented the University of Maine during the 2014–15 NCAA Division I men's ice hockey season. The team was coached by Red Gendron, in his 2nd season with the Black Bears. The Black Bears played their home games at Alfond Arena on campus in Orono, Maine, competing in Hockey East.

Personnel

Roster
As of December 16, 2014.

|}

Coaching staff

Standings

Schedule

|-
!colspan=12 style=""| Exhibition

|-
!colspan=12 style=""| Regular Season

|-
!colspan=12 style=""| Postseason

Rankings

References

Maine Black Bears men's ice hockey seasons
Maine Black Bears
Maine Black Bears
2014 in sports in Maine
2015 in sports in Maine